Carolina Ana Trindade Coruche Mendes (born 27 November 1987) is a Portuguese football striker, who plays for SC Braga and the Portugal women's national football team.

Club career

She first played for UD Ponte Frielas and SU 1º de Dezembro of the National Football Championship. She subsequently moved to Spain, where she player for UE L'Estartit and SPC Llanos de Olivenza in Spain's Primera División.

In 2013, she moved to Italy's ASD Riviera di Romagna, and the next year she signed for WFC Rossiyanka in Russia. In 2016 Mendes signed a contract with Djurgårdens IF for one year.

International career

Mendes made her debut for the senior Portugal national team in March 2007, as a substitute in a 1–1 draw with Ireland at the 2007 Algarve Cup. She was named by coach Francisco Neto in the Portugal squad for UEFA Women's Euro 2017 in the Netherlands.

In Portugal's 2–1 win over Scotland, Mendes scored the national team's first-ever goal at major international tournament finals. She scored again in the final group match against England, but Portugal lost 2–1 and was eliminated.

Honours
Braga
 Taça da Liga: 2021–22
1º de Dezembro
 Campeonato Nacional Feminino: 2010, 2011
 Taça de Portugal: 2010, 2011
Rossiyanka
 Russian Women's Football Championship: 2016

International goals
Scores and results list Portugal's goal tally first.

References

External links
 
 
 Profile at the LTA Agency

1987 births
Living people
Portuguese women's footballers
Portuguese expatriate sportspeople in Spain
Portugal women's international footballers
Expatriate women's footballers in Italy
Expatriate women's footballers in Russia
Expatriate women's footballers in Spain
UE L'Estartit players
Djurgårdens IF Fotboll (women) players
Women's association football forwards
S.U. 1º Dezembro (women) players
Campeonato Nacional de Futebol Feminino players
Sporting CP (women's football) players
Damallsvenskan players
Serie A (women's football) players
Atalanta Mozzanica Calcio Femminile Dilettantistico players
Carolina Mendes
WFC Rossiyanka players
Portuguese expatriate sportspeople in Iceland
Portuguese expatriate sportspeople in Russia
Portuguese expatriate sportspeople in Italy
Expatriate women's footballers in Iceland
Expatriate women's footballers in Sweden
FIFA Century Club
CD Badajoz Femenino players
UEFA Women's Euro 2022 players
S.C. Braga (women's football) players
Portuguese expatriate women's footballers
UEFA Women's Euro 2017 players